Major-General William Frederick Cavaye (15 February 1845 – 30 January 1926) was a British military officer and Municipal Reform Party politician.

Early life
He was the eldest son of General William Cavaye (d.1896) and his wife Isabella née Hutchinson, and was born in Edinburgh, Scotland. His father retired to 12 Royal Circus in the Stockbridge district around 1860. Following schooling at Edinburgh Academy and in Charlton he entered the Royal Military College, Sandhurst.

Military career
In 1865 Cavaye was commissioned as an ensign into the 107th Regiment of Foot. He rose through the officer ranks to become a lieutenant on 9 March 1867, a captain on 13 December 1874, and a major on 1 July 1881, having served with distinction in the Anglo-Zulu War of 1879. The 107th Foot became the 2nd Battalion of the Royal Sussex Regiment under the Childers reforms of 1881: Cavaye became the battalion's commanding officer with the rank of lieutenant-colonel on 15 August 1883.

Cavaye was further promoted, becoming Assistant Adjutant General and Chief of Staff of the Southern District with the rank of Colonel. He served "on special service" in the Second Boer War of 1899 – 1902, and was mentioned in dispatches. He was placed on half-pay on 24 March 1902, and retired from the army on 15 December 1902.

Following the outbreak of the First World War, he returned to active service. He was appointed commanding officer of the 2nd East Anglian Division in November 1914 with the rank of brigadier-general. The division did not serve abroad, but Cavaye subsequently served on "special service" with the British Expeditionary Force in France from 1917 – 1919, and was raised to the rank of major-general. From 1919 – 1920 he was a King's Messenger.

Local government
In 1906 he began his involvement in local government, when he was elected to Kensington Borough Council, in the County of London. He was one of nine councillors for the Brompton ward of the royal borough, all members of the Conservative-backed Municipal Reform Party. He was mayor of the borough for two consecutive terms in 1907 – 1909. He remained a member of the borough council until his death, latterly as an alderman.

In 1910 he was elected to the London County Council as a Municipal Reform councillor for South Kensington. He held the seat for fifteen years before retiring from the LCC at the 1925 election due to ill-health.

Family
In 1862 Cavaye married Ada Mary Barttelot, youngest daughter of Walter Barttelot, member of parliament for West Sussex.

He died at his London home, 6 Neville Terrace, SW7, on 30 January 1926. He was buried, following a military funeral, at Stopham, Sussex. In 1937 two Kensington streets, Chelsea Grove and Clifton Place, were combined into a single thoroughfare named "Cavaye Place" in honour of the general.

References

Members of London County Council
1845 births
1926 deaths
Burials in Sussex
British Army major generals
Royal Sussex Regiment officers
British Army generals of World War I
Scottish generals
Military personnel from Edinburgh
People educated at Edinburgh Academy
Graduates of the Royal Military College, Sandhurst
British Army personnel of the Anglo-Zulu War
British Army personnel of the Second Boer War
Municipal Reform Party politicians
Members of Kensington Metropolitan Borough Council